Patryk Tomasz Jaki (born 11 May 1985 in Opole) is a Polish politician, member of the European Parliament, former Secretary of State in the Ministry of Justice (First Deputy Minister of Justice) and First Deputy Attorney General, former Chairman of the Verification Committee for Reprivatisation since 2017.

Biography

Education
He attended the University of Wrocław, where he earned a Master of Arts in political science. In 2019 he submitted a thesis at the War Studies Academy setting out his ideas on Polish penitentiary system; he was awarded a Doctor of Philosophy degree for it.

Political career
On 18 November 2015, Patryk Jaki became Secretary of State in the Ministry of Justice responsible for, among other things, supervision over the Prison Service. He was also appointed Plenipotentiary of the Minister of Justice for the Implementation of the Electronic Monitoring System. He drafted an amendment to the existing law to prohibit depriving parents of the right of custody of their children on grounds of their bad financial situation. He has been entrusted with oversight over the establishment of the Museum of Cursed Soldiers and Political Prisoners of the Polish People's Republic. He is also the chairman of the Team for the Protection of Family Autonomy and Family Life in the Ministry of Justice.

Patryk Jaki is the chairman of the Central Council for Social Readaptation and Assistance to Convicts.

He initiated the establishment of the Verification Committee for Reprivatisation and, on 11 May 2017, became its chairman.

Patryk Jaki is the author of a registry of sex offenders in Poland, available on the website ms.gov.pl since 1 October 2017.

Patryk Jaki is the author of a government programme for the employment of prisoners, which has helped to increase employment among convicts by 50%.
Patryk Jaki is the chairman of the Polish Council of Penitentiary Policy.

In 2017, Jaki stated that "stopping Islamization is his Westerplatte".

On 11 October 2017, Patryk Jaki received the "Polski Kompas" (Poland's Compass) award granted by the Gazeta Bankowa monthly for his "fight against a reprivatisation mafia".

In 2017 Wprost magazine ranked him tenth on its list of 50 most influential Poles.

During elections to the European Parliament gained almost 260 thousand votes. This is the best result not from the first place on the list in the history of Polish Republic. Presently in the European Parliament - member of the Civic Freedom, Justice and Interior Committee. Reporter of the regulation concerning fighting with terrorism on the area of the European Union and vice-chairman of the European and Eastern Countries Parliament Assembly. Earlier, Deputy to the Seventh and Eighth Term Sejm; Opole Councillor during the Fifth and Sixth Term;

He is responsible for the "Save the Heroes” campaign promoting the restoration of streets named in honor of generals Emil August Fieldorf "Nil” and Zygmunt Szendzielarz "Łupaszka”, as well as the legislation initiative "Let's Restore History Lessons at Schools”

Personal life
On September 14, 2013, he married Anna Kuszkiewicz (in Cathedral Basilica of the Holy Cross, Opole). They have a son, Radosław (born in 2014), who was born with Down syndrome and a daughter, Aleksandra (born in 2020.)

References

1985 births
Living people
Members of the Polish Sejm 2011–2015
MEPs for Poland 2019–2024
United Poland politicians
Law and Justice politicians
Civic Platform politicians
People from Opole
Anti-Islam sentiment in Poland